Glen Charles Rea (born 3 September 1994) is a professional footballer who plays as a defensive midfielder or centre-back for Cheltenham Town on loan from  club Luton Town. Born in England, he played for the Republic of Ireland U21 national team.

Club career

Brighton & Hove Albion
Born in Brighton, East Sussex, Rea began his career with the youth system at Brighton & Hove Albion, before earning a professional contract after completing his two-year scholarship. On 6 February 2015, Rea signed a contract extension, keeping him at the club until 2016.

Ahead of the 2015–16 season, Rea was given squad number 26, before making his professional debut for Brighton one week later in a 1–0 win away to Southend United in the League Cup first round, with Rea playing for the full 90 minutes. Following the expiration of his loan spells at Southend United and Luton Town, Brighton activated the option of a one-year extension on Rea's contract, but were willing to let him leave on a permanent transfer. Southend and Luton both expressed an interest in signing him on a permanent basis.

Southend United (loan)
On 27 August 2015, two weeks after the League Cup fixture, Southend manager Phil Brown expressed an interest in signing Rea on loan, claiming later that day the club were close to signing him. Brighton confirmed Rea had joined Southend on loan until 2 January 2016 a day later. He made his debut in a 2–2 draw away to Coventry City on 31 August. Rea made his final appearance for Southend in a 3–0 defeat at home to Doncaster Rovers on 2 January 2016, finishing his loan spell with 16 appearances.

Luton Town
On 17 March 2016, Rea signed for League Two club Luton Town on loan until the end of the 2015–16 season, linking back up with Luton manager Nathan Jones who had previously been his first-team coach at Brighton. He made his Luton debut in a 1–0 win away to Plymouth Argyle two days later. Rea finished his loan spell with 10 appearances and started every match.

Rea joined Luton permanently on 27 June 2016 on a two-year contract for an undisclosed fee. His first appearance after signing permanently came in a 3–0 win away to Plymouth Argyle on 6 August. Rea scored his first professional goal in a 2–1 defeat at home to Grimsby Town on 10 September.

He signed a new two-year contract with Luton at the end of May 2018. He suffered a partial tear of his cruciate ligament in a 2–0 win over Burton Albion on 22 December, which ruled him out for the rest of the season after making 27 appearances and scoring one goal. Rea joined National League club Woking on 25 October 2019 on a one-month loan to build up his match fitness.

Wigan Athletic (loan)
On 31 January 2022, Rea joined League One title chasers Wigan Athletic on loan until the end of the 2021–22 season. He was ruled out for the rest of the season after suffering a knee injury in a league game against Wimbledon, and returned to Luton on 17 March 2022.

Cheltenham Town (loan)
On 31 January 2023, Rea joined League One club Cheltenham Town on loan until the end of the season, remaining with Luton for a short time whilst he completed the rehabilitation from a knee injury.

International career
Rea, who was born in England, is eligible to play for Republic of Ireland and was called up to the Republic of Ireland U21 squad on 13 November 2014. His debut came on 15 November in a 1–0 defeat to the United States, with Rea playing the match in midfield. Rea scored his first goal for the Republic of Ireland U21 on his second cap two days later, in a 2–2 draw with Russia.

Career statistics

Honours
Luton Town
EFL League Two runner-up: 2017–18
EFL League One: 2018–19

References

External links
Profile at the Luton Town F.C. website
Profile at the Football Association of Ireland website

1994 births
Living people
Footballers from Brighton
English footballers
Republic of Ireland association footballers
Republic of Ireland youth international footballers
Republic of Ireland under-21 international footballers
Association football defenders
Association football midfielders
Brighton & Hove Albion F.C. players
Southend United F.C. players
Luton Town F.C. players
Woking F.C. players
Wigan Athletic F.C. players
Cheltenham Town F.C. players
English Football League players
National League (English football) players
English people of Irish descent